930 Westphalia (prov. designation:  or ) is a very dark background asteroid and a slow rotator from the inner regions of the asteroid belt, that measures approximately  in diameter. It was discovered on 10 March 1920, by German astronomer Walter Baade at the Bergedorf Observatory in Hamburg. The carbonaceous C-type asteroid (Ch) has an exceptionally long rotation period of 100.7 hours and is likely spherical in shape. It was named after Westphalia, a region in northwestern Germany.

Orbit and classification 

Westphalia is a non-family asteroid of the main belt's background population when applying the hierarchical clustering method to its proper orbital elements. It orbits the Sun in the inner asteroid belt at a distance of 2.1–2.8 AU once every 3 years and 9 months (1,384 days; semi-major axis of 2.43 AU). Its orbit has an eccentricity of 0.14 and an inclination of 15° with respect to the ecliptic. The body's observation arc begins with its official discovery observation at Bergedorf Observatory on 10 March 1920.

Naming 

This minor planet was named after the region of Westphalia in northwestern Germany, bordering the Netherlands and the Rhine river. It is the birthplace of the discoverer Walter Baade (1893–1960). The  was mentioned in The Names of the Minor Planets by Paul Herget in 1955.

Physical characteristics 

In the Bus–Binzel SMASS classification, Westphalia is a hydrated carbonaceous C-type asteroid (Ch).

Rotation period 

In April 2015, a rotational lightcurve of Westphalia was obtained from photometric observations by Eduardo Manuel Álvarez at the Los Algarrobos Observatory  in Uruguay. Lightcurve analysis gave a rotation period of  hours with a brightness amplitude of  magnitude, indicative of a spherical, non-elongated shape. This was the first time a period could be determined for this asteroid, and, as the observer noted, there were only 18 tree-digit asteroids left for which no such measurement had yet been made. With a period above 100 hours, Westphalia is a slow rotator. While the slowest rotators have periods above 1000 hours, the vast majority of asteroids have periods between 2.2 and 20 hours.

Diameter and albedo 

The Collaborative Asteroid Lightcurve Link derives an albedo of 0.0438 and a diameter of 36.53 km based on an absolute magnitude of 11.2.

References

External links 
 Lightcurve Database Query (LCDB), at www.minorplanet.info
 Dictionary of Minor Planet Names, Google books
 Discovery Circumstances: Numbered Minor Planets (1)-(5000) – Minor Planet Center
 
 

000930
Discoveries by Walter Baade
Named minor planets
000930
000930
19200310